LGA 20xx may refer to:

 LGA 2011 (Socket R)
 LGA 2011-1 (Socket R2)
 LGA 2011-v3 (Socket R3)
 LGA 2066 (Socket R4)